Lavinia Veiongo Fotu (9 February 1879 – 24 April 1902) was the Queen consort of Tonga from 1899 to 1902, and the first wife of George Tupou II.

Life
Lavinia Veiongo was born on 9 February 1879. Her father was ʻAsipeli Kupuavanua Fotu, who served as Minister of Police, and her mother was Tōkanga Fuifuilupe. She was a namesake of her paternal grandmother, Old Lavinia, who was the daughter of the last Tuʻi Tonga Laufilitonga and considered one of the highest ranking women in Tonga.

King George Tupou II was expected to marry Princess ʻOfakivavaʻu, of the Tuʻi Kanokupolu line. However, the King changed his mind at the last minute and chose Lavinia instead. He asked the Council of Chiefs to choose between the two women, but when the majority voiced support for ʻOfa, he threatened to remain a bachelor unless he was allowed to marry Lavinia. The chiefs acquiesced and allowed the marriage to go through. The royal marriage took place on 1 June 1899 with Tongan and European guests in attendance. During the ceremony the King placed a golden crown on Lavinia's head and proclaimed her as Queen of Tonga.
Despite this, relation between the King and the rest of the country remained strained because of the rejection of ʻOfa. Supporters of both women rioted in the streets of the capital of Nukuʻalofa, attacking each other with axes, clubs, and broken bottles.

In 1900, Lavinia gave birth to their only child Princess Sālote Mafile‘o Pilolevu, who would succeed her father as Queen Sālote Tupou III. Despite the infighting between their respective supporters, Lavinia and the Princess 'Ofa became close friends. Princess 'Ofa died in December 1901 from tuberculosis. Lavinia had visited her friend at her final illness and also attended her funeral and subsequently contracted the disease. She died on 24 April 1902 at the Royal Palace. After lying in state and a royal funeral, her remains were buried at the royal burial grounds of Malaʻekula. King Tupou II greatly mourned the passing of his wife and erected a marble monument to her honor on the burial site.

Family tree

References

Bibliography

 
 

1879 births
1902 deaths
Tongan royal consorts
20th-century deaths from tuberculosis
20th-century Tongan women
19th-century Tongan women
Tuberculosis deaths in Tonga